In mathematics, specifically set theory, a cumulative hierarchy is a family of sets  indexed by ordinals  such that

 
 If  is a limit ordinal, then 

Some authors additionally require that  or that .

The union  of the sets of a cumulative hierarchy is often used as a model of set theory.

Reflection principle
A cumulative hierarchy satisfies a form of the reflection principle: any formula in the language of set theory that holds in the union  of the hierarchy also holds in some stages .

Examples
 The von Neumann universe is built from a cumulative hierarchy .
The sets  of the constructible universe form a cumulative hierarchy.
The Boolean-valued models constructed by forcing are built using a cumulative hierarchy.
The well founded sets in a model of set theory (possibly not satisfying the axiom of foundation) form a cumulative hierarchy whose union satisfies the axiom of foundation.

References
 
Set theory